Newbridge Silverware is a designer and producer of jewellery, homeware and giftware products.

History 

Newbridge Silverware was founded in 1934 as a homeware manufacturer. It is based in Newbridge, County Kildare.

In 1993, William Doyle took over as chief executive after his father, Dominic, died. Under Doyle the company expanded its product lines to include jewellery.

In 2007, the Museum of Style Icons was established at the Newbridge store and contains pieces of fashion history, including the hot pink cocktail dress worn by Audrey Hepburn in Breakfast at Tiffany's. The museum also contains clothing and other memoribilia associated with Marilyn Monroe, the Beatles, Elvis Presley, Betty White, Tippi Hedren and Princess Diana. In 2014, the company reported sales of €21.5 million.

Newbridge Silverware brand ambassadors have included Yasmin Le Bon, Sophie Dahl, Ronan O'Gara, Rob Kearney, Rozanna Purcell, Amy Huberman and Naomi Campbell, among others.

References

Newbridge, County Kildare
Manufacturing companies established in 1934
Companies of the Republic of Ireland
Design companies established in 1934
1934 establishments in Ireland
Tourist attractions in County Kildare
Museums in County Kildare